Holy Innocents’ Orthodox Church (Valiya Pally), popularly known as Mezhuveli Valiyapally, is a church in Mezhuveli, Kerala, India.

Foundation
Holy Innocents’ Orthodox Church was founded in 1860. The founder parishioners of this church were members of the ancient St. Mary’s church at Puthencavu. This is the mother church of all other churches in Mezhuveli-Kidangannoor.

Dedication
The main Thronos (Altar) is dedicated to the innocent babies killed by Herod the Great so as to avoid the loss of his throne to a newborn King of the Jews (the infant Jesus). The main feast of Mezhuveli Valiyapally is celebrated on 27 December.

Location
This beautiful church is situated beside Chengannoor-Omalloor Road. This is one of the prominent parishes in the Chengannur Orthodox Diocese of Malankara Orthodox Syrian Church.
The exact location of the church is Mezhuveli, kidangannur.

See also
 Chengannur Orthodox Diocese
 Malankara Orthodox Syrian Church

External links
 Website of the Parish
 Website of Chengannur Diocese
 Website of Malankara Orthodox Syrian Church

Churches in Alappuzha district
Religious organizations established in 1860
Malankara Orthodox Syrian church buildings
Oriental Orthodox congregations established in the 19th century
1860 establishments in India
Churches completed in 1860